Pont-Remy is a railway station in the town Pont-Remy, Somme department, region Hauts-de-France, northern France. It is situated on the Longueau–Boulogne railway, between Amiens and Abbeville. The station is served by TER Hauts-de-France trains (Abbeville - Amiens - Albert line).

In 1903, the station witnessed the arrest of three leaders of the bande à Jacob (Jacob's band), a gang of anarchists (Marius Jacob, Pélissard and Félix Bour). After a car pursuit (one of the first in France) between Abbeville and this station, a shooting ensued in which a police agent (agent Anquier) was killed.

See also
List of SNCF stations in Hauts-de-France

References

Bibliography

M. Agache-Lechat Abbeville d'autrefois, Abbeville, 1983, 240 pages, p 75

Railway stations in Somme (department)
Railway stations in France opened in 1847